Members of the New South Wales Legislative Assembly who served in the 12th parliament of New South Wales held their seats between from 1885 to 1887.
Elections for the twelfth Legislative Assembly were held between 16 and 31 October 1885 with parliament first meeting on 17 November 1985.  The Assembly was expanded from 113 to 122 members elected in 37 single member electorates, 24 two member electorates, 7 three member electorate and 4 four member electorates. The parliament had a maximum term of 3 years but was dissolved on 26 January 1886 after 14 months. The Premiers during this parliament were George Dibbs until 22 December 1885, Sir John Robertson until 26 February  1886, Sir Patrick Jennings until 20 January 1887 and Sir Henry Parkes.

See also
Dibbs ministry
Fifth Robertson ministry
Jennings ministry
Fourth Parkes ministry

Notes
There was no party system in New South Wales politics until 1887. Under the constitution, ministers were required to resign to recontest their seats in a by-election when appointed. These by-elections are only noted when the minister was defeated; in general, he was elected unopposed.

References

Members of New South Wales parliaments by term
19th-century Australian politicians